The Social Contract was a policy by the Labour government of Harold Wilson in 1970s Britain.

In return for the repeal of 1971 Industrial Relations Act, food subsidies, and a freeze on rent increases, the Trade Union Congress ensured that its members would cooperate with a programme of voluntary wage restraint.

The Social Contract aimed to avoid the difficulty of former incomes policies, allowing the employers, who in nationalised industries were the state, to treat individual groups separately in wage negotiations. There would be 12-month interval between wage settlements to prevent repeated wage demands and allow the state some level of predictability in future wage expenses, and negotiated increases in wages should be confined either to compensating for inflation since the last settlement or for anticipated future price increases before the next settlement.

It was to be the foundation on which the Chancellor Denis Healey could introduce a stronger budget in order to control the high inflation that Britain and most other Western nations had begun to confront, which Edward Heath's previous government had failed to do.

References
The Miners Strike and the Social Contract, The National Archives
1974-1979 - The Social Contract, London Metropolitan University, 2012

Politics of the United Kingdom
1970s in the United Kingdom
Harold Wilson
History of the Labour Party (UK)